The 1921 Army Cadets football team Represented the United States Military Academy in the 1921 college football season. In their seventh season under head coach Charles Dudley Daly, the Cadets compiled a  record, shut out five of their ten opponents, and outscored all opponents by a combined total of 217 to 65.  In the annual Army–Navy Game, the Cadets lost to the   The Cadets also lost to Yale and Notre Dame. 
 
Three Army players were recognized on the All-America team: halfback Walter French was selected as a third-team All-American by Walter Camp, guard Fritz Breidster was selected as a third-team All-American by Jack Veiock, sports editor of the International News Service, and a center named Larsen was selected as a second-team All-American by Walter Camp and Football World.

Schedule

References

Army
Army Black Knights football seasons
Army Cadets football